Sanita Pušpure (born 21 December 1981) is a Latvian-born Irish professional rower. She was a back-to-back world champion in the women's single scull winning her title at the 2018 World Rowing Championships in Plovdiv  and defending it at the 2019 World Rowing Championships in Ottensheim. She initially competed for Latvia at a junior level, but she moved to Ireland in 2006 and began competing for her adopted country in 2010, before gaining full Irish nationality in 2011. She was selected as the sole rowing competitor for Ireland at the 2012 Summer Olympics, where she did not win a medal.  In May 2016, she qualified for the Women's single sculls at the 2016 Summer Olympics. Sanita is now head coach of UCC Rowing Club in Cork, Ireland.

Career
She began her rowing career in her native Latvia. In 2003, she placed third in the single scull competition at the World under-23 Championships, and the following year took the gold medal in the double scull at the World Student Games.

She moved to Ireland in 2006, as her husband Kaspar got a job at Dublin Airport, and they initially lived in Cork. In 2009, she won the single sculls event at the Irish Championships, repeating that success at the following year's competition and taking the double sculls title too.

Pušpure began competing for Ireland in World Cup events during 2010, but was only allowed to compete at the World Championships after she gained Irish nationality in 2011. She was in the winning teams in the double and quad sculls at the Henley Women's Regatta in 2011. She initially aimed to qualify for the 2012 Olympics in the double scull, partnered with Lisa Dilleen. The duo finished in twelfth place at the 2011 World Championships, where the top eight teams qualified for the Olympics.

She competed in the single scull event for the first time at a World Cup event in Belgrade in May 2012, finishing in fifth place. At the Olympic qualification event in Lucerne, Switzerland, she placed second in her heat in order to make it through to the semi-final. After finishing third in the semi, she placed fourth in the final, giving Ireland a place in the women's single sculls competition at the 2012 Summer Olympics. She was selected for the Irish team at the Games as the country's only rowing competitor, and their first female single sculler since the 1980 Summer Olympics.  She reached the quarter-finals of the event.

In September 2018 she won the single sculls at the world championships in Plovdiv, Bulgaria, her first world title. She defended her title a year later in Linz-Ottensheim, Austria, and also qualified at the event for the 2020 Olympics. Puspure has been selected as a 2021 Tokyo Olympian and is expected to race the women's single scull.

Personal life
She lives with her family in Ballincollig, County Cork. Both of her children were born in Ireland. Pušpure races for Old Collegians Boat Club.

References

External links

Living people
Sportspeople from Riga
Latvian female rowers
Irish female rowers
1981 births
Rowers at the 2012 Summer Olympics
Rowers at the 2016 Summer Olympics
Rowers at the 2020 Summer Olympics
Olympic rowers of Ireland
Irish people of Latvian descent
World Rowing Championships medalists for Ireland